Timothy John Betar (born April 8, 1990), better known as TimTheTatman, is an American live streamer and internet personality on YouTube.

Career
Betar started streaming on Twitch in 2012 and has amassed over seven million followers since. Broadcasting games such as Counter-Strike: Global Offensive, Overwatch, Fortnite, and World of Warcraft, the variety channel attracts thousands of viewers each day.

Betar is a Monster Energy esports athlete and is also sponsored by Audio-Technica He was a certified Twitch partner and has been a full-time creator since March 2014. After joining YouTube on January 23, 2011, the channel has grown to 3.2 million subscribers with videos viewed over 524 million times.

With the release of Epic Games's Fortnite in July 2017, Twitch stream viewership skyrocketed. The game streamed nearly 151 million hours during the first month of release. Streamers such as Betar, Tyler "Ninja" Blevins, and Turner "Tfue" Tenney, saw a steady increase in followers as the game grew in popularity.

During E3 2018, Epic Games held its first-ever Fortnite Celebrity Pro-Am, which paired up celebrities with professional gamers to raise money for charity. Betar teamed up with Mack Wilds for the event. Betar won the award for Fan Favorite Male Streamer/Gamer of the Year at the 2018 Gamers' Choice Awards.

Betar appeared a National Football League commercial during Super Bowl LIII along with Peyton Manning, JuJu Smith-Schuster, and Marshawn Lynch. In September 2021, Betar announced an exclusivity contract with YouTube. He signed with Complexity Gaming as a part-owner and content-creator that same month.

Awards and nominations

Philanthropy
In 2018, Betar teamed up with fellow streamers to raise money for St. Jude's Children's Research Hospital under the GuardianCon charity stream marathon. The event raised over $2.7 million for children's medical research. During his time block alone, Betar set the Twitch charitable donation record by raising more than $106,000 in 4 hours.

Personal life
Betar was born on April 8, 1990. After meeting in high school, Betar and his wife Alexis were married in August 2016. The couple had a son, Brewer, on April 11, 2019.

See also
 List of most-followed Twitch channels

References

1990 births
Living people
American esports players
People from New York (state)
Place of birth missing (living people)
Twitch (service) streamers
YouTube channels launched in 2011
YouTube streamers